Allen Gaels Gaelic Athletic Association is a Gaelic football and ladies' Gaelic football club based in Drumshanbo, County Leitrim, Ireland.

History
The first GAA club was founded in Drumshanbo in 1889, St Patrick's. It died and was revived several times. As St. Francis', they won the 1963 Leitrim Junior Football Championship. In 1969 Drumshanbo merged with Ballinaglera to form Allen Gaels, taking their name from nearby Lough Allen.

The club won two Leitrim Senior Hurling Championships in the 1970s. Ballinaglera left in 1981 to re-form their own club, but Drumshanbo continued with the "Allen Gaels" name.

The club's peak came in 1991–2002, winning five senior football titles in twelve years. In 1997 Allen Gaels reached the final of the Connacht Senior Club Football Championship, losing to Corofin. Noel Moran, Padraig Kenny, and Colin McGlynn also played on the successful Leitrim team of that era.

In 1999, Allen Gaels' grounds were renamed the Shane McGettigan Memorial Park.

Honours

Gaelic football
 Leitrim Senior Football Championship (5): 1991, 1996, 1997, 2001, 2002
 Leitrim Intermediate Football Championship (1): 1989
 Leitrim Junior Football Championship (4): 1963 (as Drumshanbo St Francis), 1987, 1994, 2008
 Leitrim Minor Football Championship (2): 1965, 1967 (both as Drumshanbo St Francis)1994 as Allen Gaels

Hurling
 Leitrim Senior Hurling Championship (2): 1975, 1977

Notable players
John Owens

References

External links
Official website

Gaelic games clubs in County Leitrim
Gaelic football clubs in County Leitrim
Drumshanbo